Taimur Khan may refer to:

 Taimur Khan (cricketer, born 1975), Pakistani cricketer
 Taimur Khan (cricketer, born 1991), Pakistani cricketer who played for Quetta
 Taimur Khan (cricketer, born 1996), Pakistani cricketer who played for Rawalpindi